The women's 400 metre freestyle event at the 2014 Commonwealth Games as part of the swimming programme took place on 29 July at the Tollcross International Swimming Centre in Glasgow, Scotland.

The medals were presented by Maureen Campbell, Director of Commonwealth Games Scotland and Chair of Scottish Swimming and the quaichs were presented by Paul Bush, Director of Commonwealth Games Scotland and former Chief Executive Officer of Scottish Swimming.

Records
Prior to this competition, the existing world and Commonwealth Games records were as follows.

The following records were established during the competition:

Results

Heats

Final

References

External links

Women's 400 metre freestyle
Commonwealth Games
2014 in women's swimming